Oba Ado (original Bini name was Edo) who reigned from 1630-1669 was the second Oba of Lagos. He was son of Ashipa an Awori-Isheri Chieftain appointed as the first ruler of Eko by the Oba of Benin and a Daughter of the Oba of Benin.  Ado's son, Gabaro was the third Oba of Lagos.

Second Oba of Lagos
Ado collected yearly tributes from his subjects which in turn were remitted to the Oba of Benin as tribute.

References

People from Lagos
Obas of Lagos
History of Lagos
Yoruba monarchs
17th-century monarchs in Africa
17th-century Nigerian people
17th-century in Lagos
Residents of Lagos